Drepanosticta lankanensis (drooping shadowdamsel) is a species of damselfly in the family Platystictidae. It is endemic to Sri Lanka.

References

 Asian Odonates
 Animal diversity web
 Sri Lanka Endemics
 List of odonates of Sri Lanka

Damselflies of Sri Lanka
Insects described in 1931